Elections were held in Northern Mindanao for seats in the House of Representatives of the Philippines on May 10, 2010.

The candidate with the most votes won that district's seat for the 15th Congress of the Philippines.

Summary

Bukidnon

1st District
Candido Pancrudo, Jr. is the incumbent.

The result of the election is under protest in the House of Representatives Electoral Tribunal.

2nd District
Incumbent Teofisto Guingona III will run for Senate. Wenifredo Agripo is the Liberal Party's nominee for the district's seat.

3rd District
Jose Zubiri III is the incumbent.

Cagayan de Oro

1st District

Incumbent Rolando Uy (switched to Lakas Kampi CMD from Nacionalista) will run for mayor of Cagayan de Oro. Rainier Uy is running in his stead, but as Lakas-Kampi-CMD's candidate.

2nd District

Rufus Rodriguez is the incumbent.

Camiguin

Pedro Romualdo is the incumbent.

Iligan

Iligan will have their first representative alone for the first time since 1984. Iligan was formerly grouped with Lanao del Norte's 1st district. Incumbent 1st district of Lanao del Norte representative Vicente Belmonte, Jr. will run in this district.

Lanao del Norte

1st District
Incumbent Vicente Belmonte, Jr. is running for representative from Iligan. The Liberal Party nominated Romulo Rizalda to run in this district.

2nd District
Incumbent Abdullah Dimaporo is in his third consecutive term already and is ineligible for reelection. His daughter Fatima is his party's nominee for the district's seat while his wife, former governor Imelda Dimaporo is his party's nominee for the first district.

Misamis Occidental

1st District

Marina Clarete is not running; her husband Ernie is her party's nominee for this district.

2nd District

Incumbent Herminia M. Ramiro  is on her third consecutive term already and is ineligible for reelection.

Misamis Oriental

1st District

Incumbent Danilo Lagbas (Lakas-CMD) died on June 7, 2008, leaving the seat vacant. The successor party of Lakas-CMD, Lakas-Kampi-CMD nominated Genaro Jose Moreno, Jr., while Lagbas' daughter Jennifer is the Liberal Party's nominee.

2nd District

Yevgeny Vicente Emano is the incumbent.

References

External links
Official website of the Commission on Elections

2010 Philippine general election
2010